Gallatin Township is an inactive township in Clay County, in the U.S. state of Missouri.

Gallatin Township was established in the early 1820s, taking its name from Albert Gallatin.

References

Townships in Missouri
Townships in Clay County, Missouri